Palaiyapatti Therkusethi is a village in the Thanjavur taluk of Thanjavur district, Tamil Nadu, India.

Demographics 

As per the 2001 census, Palaiyapatti Therkusethi had a total population of 2072 with 1015 males and 1057 females. The sex ratio was 1041. The literacy rate was 61.68.

References 

 

Villages in Thanjavur district